This is a list of notable people from Iceland, arranged in categories and ordered alphabetically by first name, following the usual naming conventions of Iceland.

Business
Björgólfur Thor Björgólfsson, billionaire entrepreneur
Björgólfur Guðmundsson, former billionaire entrepreneur, father of Thor Björgólfsson (above)
Eggert Magnússon, businessman and former chairman of the English Premiership football club West Ham United
Hreiðar Már Sigurðsson, businessman
Jón Ásgeir Jóhannesson, billionaire and founder of the Bónus supermarket and the Baugur Group
Magnús Þorsteinsson, businessman
Þorsteinn M. Jónsson, banker
Arnor Sighvatsson, economist

Arts and culture

Architects
Guðjón Samúelsson
Guðmundur Jónsson
Halldóra Briem
Högna Sigurðardóttir

Authors

Arnaldur Indriðason, writer
Davíð Stefánsson, poet
Einar Benediktsson, writer, poet
Einar Kárason, writer
Einar Hjörleifsson Kvaran editor, novelist, poet, dramatist
Einar Már Guðmundsson, writer
Guðmundur G. Hagalín, writer, poet
Halldór Kiljan Laxness, writer, poet, Nobel Prize winner
Hallgrímur Helgason, writer
Jón Kalman Stefánsson, writer, poet
Jón Thoroddsen, author
Jónas Hallgrímsson, writer, poet
Jóhannes úr Kötlum, writer, poet
Kristín Marja Baldursdóttir, writer
Magnus Magnusson, television presenter, writer
Nína Björk Árnadóttir, poet, novelist, playwright
Ólafur Jóhann Ólafsson, writer
Sjón, poet, writer, lyricist
Snorri Hjartarson, poet
Snorri Sturluson, historian, poet
Steinunn Sigurðardóttir, writer, poet
Stephan G. Stephansson, Western Icelander, poet
Tómas Guðmundsson, poet
Vigdís Grímsdóttir, writer
Viktor Arnar Ingólfsson, writer
Yrsa Sigurðardóttir, writer
Þórarinn Eldjárn, writer, poet
Þórbergur Þórðarson, writer, poet

Film, radio, and TV
Anita Briem, actress
Ágústa Eva Erlendsdóttir, best known as Silvía Nótt (Silvia Night), actress, singer, model, TV personality.
Baltasar Kormákur, film actor and film director
Friðrik Þór Friðriksson, film director
Gunnar Hansen, film actor
Hilmir Snær Guðnason, film actor
Hrafn Gunnlaugsson, film director
Karl Júlíusson, film production designer/costume designer
Magnus Magnusson, television presenter, writer
Magnús Scheving, writer, actor, athlete, creator of LazyTown
Margrét Vilhjálmsdóttir, actress
Marinó Sigurðsson, actor
Markús Örn Antonsson, former mayor of Reykjavík and former director of RÚV
Páll Magnússon, former director of RÚV, a member of the Icelandic parliament
Ragnar Bragason, director
Stefán Karl Stefánsson, actor
Tinna Gunnlaugsdóttir, actress and former Artistic Director of the National Theatre of Iceland
Þröstur Leó Gunnarsson, actor
Örvar Þóreyjarson Smárason, poet, writer, musician

Music
Anna Mjöll, singer-songwriter
Arndís Halla (born 1969), opera singer, songwriter and entertainer
Ágústa Eva Erlendsdóttir, more commonly known as Silvía Nótt, singer, actress, and TV personality
Ásgeir Trausti, singer-songwriter
Bára Gísladóttir (born 1989), musician and composer
Björgvin Halldórsson, singer
Björk Guðmundsdóttir, singer-songwriter more commonly known as Björk
Bragi Ólafsson, musician
Diddú (Sigrún Hjálmtýsdóttir), soprano and songwriter
Emilíana Torrini, singer-songwriter
Einar Örn Benediktsson, musician
Eiríkur Hauksson, musician
Garðar Thór Cortes, tenor
Greta Salóme Stefánsdóttir, singer, violinist
Gísli Magnússon, pianist
Hafdís Bjarnadóttir (born 1977), composer and musician
Hafdís Huld, singer
Haukur Tómasson, composer
Hildur Guðnadóttir, musician and composer, first solo woman to win a Golden Globe Award for Best Original Score
Hilmar Örn Hilmarsson, musician, art director, and chief goði of the Icelandic Ásatrú Association
Jóhann Jóhannsson, composer, musician, producer
Jón Jósep Snæbjörnsson, (Jónsi) singer
Jón Leifs, composer
Jón Þór Birgisson, singer, guitarist
Jóhanna Guðrún Jónsdóttir, pop singer (Yohanna)
Kjartan Ólafsson (born 1958), composer, professor
Mugison, composer, musician
Ólafur Arnalds, composer, musician
Páll Óskar Hjálmtýsson (Paul Oscar), pop singer, songwriter and disc jockey
Ragnheiður Gröndal, musician
Sigurður Bragason, baritone singer and composer
Örvar Þóreyjarson Smárason, poet, writer and musician

Musical bands and groups

Agent Fresco
Amiina
Ampop
Árstíðir
Bang Gang
Changer
Cynic Guru
Dikta
FM Belfast
GusGus
Kaleo
HAM
Hatari
Mammút
Mezzoforte
Mínus
Mugison
múm
Nylon
Of Monsters and Men
Quarashi
Samaris
Seabear
Sigur Rós
Singapore Sling
Skálmöld
Ske
Sólstafir
The Sugarcubes
Trúbrot
Voces Thules

Painters and visual artists
Kristleifur Björnsson
Einar Hákonarson
Erró
Jóhannes Sveinsson Kjarval

Photographers
Ragnar Axelsson
Ragnar Th. Sigurdsson

Sculptors
Ásmundur Sveinsson
Bertel Thorvaldsen
Einar Jónsson
Gunnfríður Jónsdóttir
Nína Sæmundsson 
Olafur Eliasson
Ríkarður Jónsson
Steinunn Thorarinsdottir

Miss World
Hólmfríður "Hófí" Karlsdóttir, Miss World 1985
Linda Pétursdóttir, Miss World 1988
Unnur Birna Vilhjálmsdóttir, Miss World 2005

Historical figures of Iceland

Ari Þorgilsson, priest and author of Íslendingabók, a historical work
Egill Skallagrímsson, Viking skald
Eiríkur rauði, (e. Eirík he Red, Old Norse. Eirīkr hinn rauði) named Greenland
Freydís Eiríksdóttir
Guðmundur Arason
Guðríður Þorbjarnardóttir, explorer
Ingólfur Arnarson
Ísleifur Gissurarson
Kolbeinn Tumason
Leifur Eiríksson (e. Leif Ericson, Old Norse Leifr Eiríksson), discovered America in the year 1000 and named it Vínland (Land of Wine)
Loftur Sæmundsson, priest and chieftain at Oddi
Solveig Guðmundsdóttir, heir and landlord
Snorri Sturluson
Þorfinnur "Karlsefni" Þórðarson
Þorvaldur Eríksson
Vilhjálmur Stefánsson, Western Icelander, Arctic explorer
Þóra Magnúsdóttir, born 1100 in Norway, daughter of Magnus III of Norway, a direct descendant of Harald Fairhair the first Norwegian King. Þóra Magnúsdóttir married an Icelander and moved to Iceland.

Politics

Albert Guðmundsson, former minister
Árni Sigfússon, politician
Ásgeir Ásgeirsson, former president
Bergdis Ellertsdóttir, ambassador
Birgitta Jónsdóttir, member of parliament
Björn Bjarnason, minister of justice and ecclesiastical affairs
Davíð Oddsson, former prime minister and former mayor of Reykjavík
Geir H. Haarde, former prime minister, former foreign minister
Guðni Thorlacius Jóhannesson, current president
Halldór Ásgrímsson, former prime minister
Halldór Blöndal, former minister
Hannes Hafstein, first prime minister
Hannibal Valdimarsson, chairman of two parties and one electoral alliance
Hulda Jakobsdóttir (1911–1998), Iceland's first woman mayor
Jóhanna Sigurðardóttir, former prime minister, also the world's first openly gay head of government
Jón Baldvin Hannibalsson, former foreign minister, ambassador
Jón Loftsson, chieftain and politician
Jón Sigurðsson, independence leader
Katrín Jakobsdóttir, current Prime minister
Katrín Magnússon (1858–1932), early Reykjavik municipal councillor and women's rights activist
Kristján Eldjárn, former president
Markús Örn Antonsson, former mayor of Reykjavík and former director of RÚV
Ólafur Ragnar Grímsson, former president
Sigmundur Davíð Gunnlaugsson, former prime minister
Steingrímur Hermannsson, former prime minister
Sveinn Björnsson, first president
Vigdís Finnbogadóttir, former president, first elected female head of state
Þorsteinn Pálsson, former prime minister

Scholarship and academia
Agnar Helgason, anthropologist
Ari Brynjolfsson, physicist
Ari Þorgilsson, documentarian, chronicler
Ari Trausti Guðmundsson, geologist, explorer, documentarian
Árni Magnússon, documentarian
Ásgeir Helgason, psychologist, public health scientist
Auður Eir Vilhjálmsdóttir, first female priest
Eiríkur Magnússon, librarian and lecturer at Cambridge University, co-translator with William Morris
Gauti Eggertsson, economist at Brown University
Gisli Gudjonsson, professor of forensic psychology
Gísli Pálsson, anthropologist
Guðbrandur Vigfússon, lexicographer, editor, and lecturer at Oxford University
Guðmundur Eiríksson, judge and law professor
Hannes Hólmsteinn Gissurarson, political scientist
Helgi Valdimarsson, immunologist
Jón Steinsson, economist at University of California, Berkeley
Hjörtur Þórðarson, inventor
Kári Stefánsson, founder of deCODE genetics
Magnús Eiríksson, theologian
Marga Ingeborg Thome, nursing professor
Margrét Hermanns-Auðardóttir, archaeologist
Niels Finsen, physician, Nobel Prize winner (Icelandic parents)
Ólafía Einarsdóttir, archaeologist
Páll Skúlason, philosopher, former Rector of the University of Iceland
Reynir Böðvarsson, seismologist
Sigurdur Helgason, mathematician
Sigurður Nordal, philosopher
Sigurður Þórarinsson, geologist, volcanologist, professor
Snorri Sturluson, documentarian, writer
Stefán Einarsson, linguist and literary historian
Vilhjálmur Árnason, philosopher
Þór Whitehead, historian
Þorsteinn Gylfason, philosopher

Sports and games

Football (Soccer)

 Rúrik Gíslason, professional footballer, currently at SV Sandhausen
Albert Guðmundsson, first Icelandic professional footballer, played for Valur, Rangers, A.C. Milan, Arsenal and FC Nancy. 
Arnór Guðjohnsen, former professional footballer, father of Eiður Guðjohnsen
Aron Gunnarsson, professional footballer, currently at Cardiff City FC
Ásgeir Sigurvinsson, former professional footballer
Birkir Bjarnason, professional footballer, currently at Aston Villa F.C.
Eggert Jónsson, professional footballer, currently at Wolverhampton Wanderers
Eiður Smári Guðjohnsen, professional footballer, top scorer for Icelandic national team
Emil Hallfreðsson, professional footballer, currently at Udinese Calcio
Eyjólfur Héðinsson, professional footballer, currently at SønderjyskE
Guðni Bergsson, former professional footballer, played for teams such as Tottenham Hotspur F.C. and Bolton Wanderers
Gylfi Sigurðsson, professional footballer, currently at Everton F.C.
Heiðar Helguson, professional footballer, currently at Cardiff City FC
Heimir Hallgrímsson, manager of the Iceland national football team, also a football player and dentist 
Hermann Hreiðarsson, professional footballer, currently at ÍBV
Ívar Ingimarsson, former professional footballer
Jóhannes Karl Guðjónsson, professional footballer, currently at Knattspyrnufélag ÍA
Teitur Thordarson, former professional footballer

Chess
Bobby Fischer, former world chess champion, granted Icelandic citizenship on 21 March 2005
Friðrik Ólafsson, chess grandmaster

Handball
Arnór Atlason, handball player who plays for FCK Håndbold in Denmark.
Aron Pálmarsson, handball player who plays for FC Barcelona Handbol
Guðjón Valur Sigurðsson, handball player who plays for Paris Saint-Germain Handball in Germany.
Ólafur Stefánsson, handball player, Rhein-Neckar Löwen. Formerly of Wuppertal, Magdeburg and Ciudad Real.
Snorri Steinn Guðjónsson, handball player who plays for Rhein-Neckar Löwen in Germany.

Strongmen
Benedikt Magnússon, Raw Deadlift world record holder
Hafþór Júlíus Björnsson, 2018 World's Strongest Man 3 x Arnold Strongman Classic Champion and Deadlift world record holder
Jón Páll Sigmarsson, 4 x World's Strongest Man
Magnús Magnússon
Magnús Ver Magnússon, 4 x World's Strongest Man
Stefán Sölvi Pétursson, World's Strongest Man Finalist

Others
Anníe Þórisdóttir, back-to-back CrossFit Games winner (2011, 2012)
Einar Ragnarsson Kvaran, engineer, teacher, genealogist and writer
Fiann Paul, fastest ocean rower, most record breaking explorer, most Guinness World Records decorated athlete
Guðrún Erlendsdóttir (1936–2013), first woman to become a judge of the Supreme Court of Iceland
Gunnar Nelson, MMA fighter
Halldór Helgason, snowboarder
Katrín Davíðsdóttir, back-to-back CrossFit Games winner (2015, 2016)
Kristján Einar Kristjánsson, racing driver, currently racing in British formula 3
Sara Sigmundsdóttir, CrossFit Games athlete
Sigurlína Ingvarsdóttir (born 1978), video games producer
Þórunn Jónassen (1850–1922), first chair of Thorvaldsensfélagið and early Reykjavik city councillor 
Vala Flosadóttir, pole vaulter
Vilhelmína Lever (1802–1879), shopkeeper who voted in municipal elections in 1863 and 1866 before women such as her were officially given voting rights